Joseph C. Hodgson (1894 – after 1913) was an English professional footballer who played as a winger.

References

1894 births
English footballers
Association football wingers
Rawmarsh Town F.C. players
Grimsby Town F.C. players
English Football League players
Year of death missing